Debasish "Deba" Dutta is an American mechanical engineer and higher education administrator. He is the current chancellor of the University of Michigan-Flint.

He has served as a Distinguished Professor of Engineering and is the former Chancellor at Rutgers University–New Brunswick, Provost of Purdue University, and Associate Provost and Dean of the Graduate College at the University of Illinois Urbana-Champaign. Dutta is an Elected Fellow of the American Association for the Advancement of Science and American Society of Mechanical Engineers.

Career

University of Michigan-Flint 
Dutta was appointed chancellor of the University of Michigan - Flint on June 20, 2019, with a term beginning August 1, 2019. He has been part of University of Michigan since the beginning of his career in which he started as assistant professor of mechanical engineering and was promoted to professor in 2000. He also was director of the College of Engineering's Program in Manufacturing and director of interdisciplinary professional programs. He returned to The University of Michigan to the Flint campus after serving as the chancellor of Rutgers University.

Rutgers University-New Brunswick 
Dutta was appointed chancellor of Rutgers University-New Brunswick in July 2017. As Chancellor of Rutgers University-New Brunswick, Dutta led the largest Rutgers campus with over 40,000 students, 2,000 faculty and 5,000 staff. He engaged the New Brunswick Faculty Council on wide range of issues soliciting their input and ideas. The Faculty Council viewed him as "a model for how administrators should interact with faculty in shared governance relationships.”  Dutta created a new administrative structure for the campus to bring focus and accountability to key functional areas. He oversaw the matriculation of the largest first-year class in history, the reversal of a three-year decline in research funding and increased alumni engagement. Dutta worked extensively with state legislators, business and community leaders to create institutional momentum around student success, affordability and academic excellence.

On July 25, 2018, Dutta announced his resignation as chancellor in an email to the Rutgers community citing misalignment of vision for the chancellorship. President Barchi, in his 2018 Report to the University Senate, mentioned that the role of the Rutgers-New Brunswick chancellor does not easily correspond to common job titles at other university systems. He wrote, "I am grateful to Dr. Dutta for the year that he served as chancellor at Rutgers–New Brunswick, for the programs he initiated to move the university to a new level of excellence, and for his passionate support of the students."
In an article by Inside Higher Ed, Rutgers Faculty Council Executive Committee members said Dutta "seemed to listen and was responsive" and that as chancellor he "galvanized faculty members to work toward a vision of community." Several faculty members told the publication they were sad to see him leave the position.  The feeling was not universal, as many were upset that Dutta was offered a sabbatical year at the pay rate of $480,000 which he accepted even though he was not contractually obligated to receive this payment and he never returned as a faculty member.

Purdue University 
Starting in July 2014, Dutta served as Provost and Executive Vice President for Academic Affairs at Purdue University. In July 2015, he also assumed the role of Chief Diversity Officer for Purdue, a move that was criticized by representatives from the National Association of Diversity Officers in Higher Education. His significant contributions to academic excellence, diversity and student success at Purdue were recognized by a Resolution of Appreciation adopted by the Purdue University Board of Trustees.

When it was announced Dutta would leave Purdue for Rutgers, Purdue President Mitch Daniels said of Dutta, "He has made an enormous and positive difference for Purdue and has proven himself an effective change agent in a sector where such people are scarce. Immensely talented leaders often attract the attention of others and so it is in this case." While Provost, Purdue purchased the for-profit Kaplan University, renamed Purdue Global. The move has been criticized as a failure that cost Purdue millions of dollars and did not achieve projected growth.

University of Illinois at Urbana-Champaign 
Dutta served as Associate Provost and Dean of the Graduate College from January 2009 until June 2014. He was responsible for facilitating and nurturing interdisciplinary and multi-disciplinary connections, assuring integrity and quality of graduate programs, and providing essential graduate student services. In 2011, he chaired the steering committee for Stewarding Excellence at Illinois, an institution-wide program for cost control and organizational efficiency created in the face of falling state revenues. He also chaired a campus-wide committee to assess doctoral education at Illinois including the size, quality, effectiveness, demand, and operational costs of individual doctoral programs. At Illinois, he was Edward and Jane Marr Gutgsell Endowed Professor of Mechanical Science and Engineering.

As a Scholar in Residence at the National Academy of Engineering, Dutta completed two projects—The Lifelong Learning Imperative in Engineering study, completed and published in 2012, and the Educate to Innovate study, completed and published in 2014.

National Science Foundation 

In 2004, Dutta was tapped by the National Science Foundation (NSF) to lead Integrative Graduate Education and Research Traineeship (IGERT), the flagship graduate education and research traineeship program at NSF. Later, he was appointed acting director, Division of Graduate Education overseeing several education programs across  the foundation. Dutta also served as Senior Advisor in the directorate. While at NSF, he helped create new partnerships with the National Institutes of Health and the Office of Naval Research. NSF Director Arden Bement appointed him to the NSF's strategic planning committee where he chaired the Learning and Workforce Development group for the Cyberinfrastructure Vision for the 21st Century.

University of Michigan, Ann Arbor 
Dutta joined Michigan as assistant professor of mechanical engineering in 1989 and became full professor in 2000. He was director of the Program in Manufacturing and the founding director of InterPro, a new unit established for interdisciplinary professional programs which grew and flourished for more than a decade.

References

Fellows of the American Association for the Advancement of Science
Rutgers University faculty
American mechanical engineers
University of Evansville alumni
Purdue University alumni
Jadavpur University alumni
Living people
University of Michigan faculty
Year of birth missing (living people)
University of Michigan–Flint people
Indian American
American Hindus
Indian expatriates in the United States